The  is an expressway connecting Sayō in Hyōgo Prefecture and Tottori, the capital and largest city in Tottori Prefecture. It is owned and operated partly by the West Nippon Expressway Company and the Ministry of Land, Infrastructure, Transport and Tourism. The expressway is signed as an auxiliary route of National Route 373 as well as E29 under the Ministry of Land, Infrastructure, Transport and Tourism's "2016 Proposal for Realization of Expressway Numbering."

Naming
The expressway is officially referred to as the Chūgoku-Ōdan Expressway Himeji Tottori Route. The Chūgoku-Ōdan Expressway Himeji Tottori Route is the official designation for the Sanyō Expressway between Sanyō Himeji-Nishi Interchange and Harima Junction, the Harima Expressway between Harima Junction and Yamazaki Junction, the Chūgoku Expressway between Yamazaki Junction and Sayō Junction, and the Tottori Expressway between Sayō Junction and Tottori Interchange (concurrent with the Chūgoku-Ōdan Expressway Himeji Tottori Route).

Route description
From Sayo Junction to Sayo Toll Gate the expressway is maintained and tolled by the West Nippon Expressway Company. The rest of the expressway is able to be driven without any fees. That section of the expressway is maintained by the Chūgoku branch of the Ministry of Land, Infrastructure, Transport and Tourism.

The entire expressway has only one lane in each direction, except for the section between Sayō Junction and Sayō Toll Gate.

History
The first section of the Tottori Expressway to open was the  Shidosaka Tunnel section between Sakane Junction in Nishiawakura and Chizu in 1981. The final section of the expressway (8.8 km between Ōhara Interchange and Nishi-Awakura Interchange) was opened on March 23, 2013.

List of interchanges and features

 IC - interchange, SIC - smart interchange, JCT - junction, SA - service area, PA - parking area, BS - bus stop, TN - tunnel, TB - toll gate

References

External links
 West Nippon Expressway Company

Expressways in Japan
Roads in Hyōgo Prefecture
Roads in Okayama Prefecture
Roads in Tottori Prefecture